Marcel Tanzmayr (born 13 January 2002) is an Austrian footballer who plays as a forward for First Vienna.

Career
Tanzmayr moved to Austrian Regionalliga East club First Vienna on 5 February 2022, signing a one-year contract, alongside former Austria international Deni Alar.

Career statistics

Notes

References

2002 births
Living people
Austrian footballers
Austria youth international footballers
Association football forwards
Austrian Football Bundesliga players
SKN St. Pölten players
2. Liga (Austria) players
First Vienna FC players